The 1994 Copa Interamericana was the 16th. edition of the Copa Interamericana. The final took place between Argentine club Vélez Sarsfield and Costa Rican side Club Sport Cartaginés and was staged over two legs on February 17 and February 24, 1996. 

Coached by Carlos Bianchi, Vélez Sarsfield team was formed by most of players that had won the 1994 Intercontinental Cup with the addition of Marcelo Herrera to replace José Basualdo (tradedd to Boca Juniors) and some players promoted from the youth divisions.

The first leg, held in Cartago, ended in a 0–0 tie while in the second leg in Buenos Aires, Vélez Sarsfield beat Cartaginés 2–0, therefore the Argentine club won their first Interamericana trophy, achieving their third international title within two years.

Qualified teams

Venues

Match details

First Leg

Second Leg

References

i
i
Copa Interamericana
Football in Buenos Aires